Devery is both a given name and surname:
Devery Freeman (1913–2005), American writer and union activist
Devery Henderson (born 1982), American football player
Dermot Devery, Irish hurler
Pat Devery (born 1922), Australian rugby league footballer
Terry Devery (born 1938), Australian rules footballer
William Stephen Devery (1854–1919), American police chief

See also
Deverry